The Prince and the Pilgrim is a 1995 fantasy novel by Mary Stewart. It is a stand-alone novel, has an oblique reference to King Arthur, and is not a part of Stewart's Merlin Trilogy.

Plot 
The Prince, the protagonist, is named Alexander. His father, Prince Baudouin, is murdered by the king of Cornwall, King March. When Alexander comes of age, he sets out to Camelot to seek justice from King Arthur and to avenge his father's death.

The Pilgrim is named Alice. She rescues a young French nobleman who has in his possession an enchanted silver cup. The chalice may be the mysterious and much-sought-after Holy Grail.

Prince Alexander is diverted in his quest by the enchantments of Morgan le Fay, the seductive but evil sorceress. She persuades him to attempt a theft of the cup so that she can gain power over King Arthur and his court. Alexander's search for the mysterious cup leads him to Alice. Together the prince and the pilgrim find what they have really been seeking: love.

The tale is a self-contained novel taking place during Arthur's reign (possibly during the events in The Last Enchantment), and does not continue the story of The Wicked Day. It covers the time before Merlin the Enchanter's defeat.

Release 

 1995, Great Britain. Hodder & Stoughton. Publication date November 1995. Hardcover.
 1996, USA. William Morrow and Company. Publication date January 1996. Hardcover.
 1997, USA. Ballantine/Fawcett Crest. Publication date April 1997. Paperback.

Reception

1995 British novels
Modern Arthurian fiction
American fantasy novels
Novels set in sub-Roman Britain
Novels by Mary Stewart
Fictional princes
Hodder & Stoughton books